was a  tall Ferris wheel at Palette Town in Odaiba, Japan.

Description and history 
When it opened in 1999, it was the world's tallest Ferris wheel. It has the same  diameter as its world record predecessor, the Tempozan Ferris Wheel, at Osaka, but its overall height is  greater. Daikanransha lost its world's tallest status to the  London Eye, which officially opened on December 31, 1999, but which did not open to the public until March 2000 because of technical problems.

It is the third tallest Ferris wheel ever constructed in Japan, and, since the closure of  Sky Dream Fukuoka in September 2009, the second tallest still in operation, after the  Diamond and Flower Ferris Wheel. It is also Asia's 10th tallest and the world's 12th tallest wheel ever constructed.

Daikanransha is visible from the central urban area of Tokyo, and passengers can see the Tokyo Tower, the twin-deck Rainbow Bridge, and Haneda Airport, as well as central Tokyo, during their 16-minute ride. The Bōsō Peninsula and Mount Fuji, the highest mountain in Japan, can also be seen on a clear day, and at night the wheel is brightly lit by 120,000 neon tubes programmed to display multiple patterns in over 100 colours.

Due to the redevelopment plan for the entire Palette Town, the Ferris wheel was closed in August 2022.

References

External links

  

Buildings and structures in Koto, Tokyo
Ferris wheels in Japan
Odaiba
Tourist attractions in Tokyo
1999 establishments in Japan
Former Ferris wheels